The Roman Catholic Diocese of Basankusu is a Latin suffragan diocese in the Ecclesiastical province of the Metropolitan Mbandaka-Bikoro in the Democratic Republic of the Congo.

Its cathedral episcopal see is Cathédrale Saints-Pierre-et-Paul (Saints Peter and Paul) in the town of Basankusu.

History 
 Established on July 28, 1926, as Apostolic Prefecture of Basankusu on territory split off from the then Apostolic Vicariate of Nouvelle-Anvers
 January 8, 1948: Promoted as Apostolic Vicariate of Basankusu 
 Lost territory on 14 June 1951 to establish the then Apostolic Prefecture of Isangi (now a diocese)
 Promoted on November 10, 1959, as Diocese of Basankusu, ceasing to be exempt

Ordinaries 
(all Latin Rite, mostly -initially missionary- members of Latin congregations)

 Apostolic Prefects of Basankusu  
 Gerardo Wantenaar, Mill Hill Missionaries (M.H.M.) (1927.02.02 – 1948.01.08 see below)

 Apostolic Vicars of Basankusu  
 Gerardo Wantenaar, M.H.M., Titular Bishop of Uzalis (1948.07.08 – 1951.12.03) (see above 1948.01.08 – 1951.12.03)
 Willem van Kester, M.H.M., Titular Bishop of Legia (1952.06.19 – 1959.11.10 see below)

 Bishops of Basankusu 
 Willem van Kester, M.H.M. (see above 1959.11.10 – 1974.11.18)
 Ignace Matondo Kwa Nzambi, Scheutists (C.I.C.M.) (1974.11.18 – 1998.06.27), appointed Bishop of Molegbe
 Joseph Mokobe Ndjoku (2001.11.09 - ...), previously Apostolic Administrator (1998 – 2001.11.09) while Bishop of Bokungu–Ikela (Democratic Republic of Congo) (1993.12.06 – 2001.11.09)

See also 
 Roman Catholicism in the Democratic Republic of the Congo

Sources and external links
 Giga-Catholic Information
 Catholic Hierarchy

Basankusu
Roman Catholic dioceses in the Democratic Republic of the Congo
Christian organizations established in 1926
Roman Catholic dioceses and prelatures established in the 20th century
Articles containing video clips
Roman Catholic Ecclesiastical Province of Mbandaka-Bikoro